The 1918 Maine gubernatorial election took place on September 9, 1918.

Incumbent Republican Governor Carl Milliken was elected to a second term in office, defeating Democratic candidate Bertrand G. McIntire.

Results

Notes

References

Gubernatorial
1918
Maine
September 1918 events